Troublesome Night is a 1997 Hong Kong horror comedy film produced by Nam Yin and directed by Steve Cheng, Victor Tam and Herman Yau. It is the first of 20 films in the Troublesome Night film series.

Plot
The film is set in the haunted streets of Hong Kong, with four loosely connected stories put together in one film. A group of youngsters go on a camping trip in the countryside, where Ken encounters a mysterious woman near a grave. After the encounter, his life changes as he becomes a victim of the supernatural. As his friends return to Hong Kong without him, another story begins. Mrs To has made arrangements to celebrate her wedding anniversary with her husband but he does not show up. The outcome of the second story leads to another story about Ken's friend, Jojo, having a romantic affair with a ghost. The fourth story is about Peter Butt visiting a haunted theatre with some of Ken's friends.

Cast
 Simon Lui as Peter
 Louis Koo as Ken
 Allen Ting as Ball
 Jason Chu as Bee
 Ada Choi as Ken's love interest
 Teresa Mak as Jojo
 Pak Kar-sin as fat girl
 Law Lan as ghostly granny
 Lee Lik-chi as director
 Frankie Ng as Ng Tai-hung
 Kingdom Yuen as Sister Dan
 Christy Chung as Mrs To
 Sunny Chan as To Ka-ming
 Hui Fan as antique shop boss
 Lee Siu-kei as Dr Ho
 Christine Ng as May
 Ivy Leung as ghost in theatre
 Kenix Kwok as Ann
 Lui Tat at Uncle Ho
 Hau Woon-ling as boat woman

See also
 Vengeful ghost

External links
 
 

Troublesome Night (film series)
1997 films
1990s comedy horror films
Hong Kong comedy horror films
Films set in Hong Kong
1990s Cantonese-language films
1997 horror films
1990s ghost films
Films directed by Herman Yau
Hong Kong supernatural horror films
Supernatural comedy films
1997 comedy films
Hong Kong ghost films
1990s Hong Kong films